The SkyDancer SD-260 was an American aerobatic homebuilt biplane that was designed and produced by SkyDancer Aviation of Louisville, Kentucky, introduced in the mid-1990s. When it was available the aircraft was supplied as a kit.

Design and development
The SD-260 featured a strut-braced biplane layout, a two-seats-in-tandem open cockpit, with an optional bubble canopy, fixed conventional landing gear with wheel pants and a single engine in tractor configuration.

The aircraft fuselage was made from welded 4130 steel tubing. The wing was supported by interplane struts, cabane struts and flying wires.

The manufacturer estimated the construction time from the supplied kit as 1200 hours.

Operational history
In March 2014 no examples were registered in the United States with the Federal Aviation Administration, although a total of two had been registered at one time. It is unlikely any remain in existence.

Variants
SD-200 Basic
Proposed  model, not built
SD-200C Classic
Proposed  model, not built
SD-260
Base  model, two built
SD-300S
Proposed  single-seat model for advanced aerobatic maneuvers, not built

Specifications (SD-260)

See also
List of aerobatic aircraft

References

SD-260
1990s United States sport aircraft
Single-engined tractor aircraft
Biplanes
Homebuilt aircraft
Aerobatic aircraft